SBI Holdings, sometimes referred to as Strategic Business Innovator Group, is a financial services company group based in Tokyo, Japan. The group's businesses and companies are held primarily at SBI Holdings. The company provides financial services in a wide range of categories, including securities, asset management, banking and insurance and has formed an Internet-based financial conglomerate. The group also has a biotechnology-related business line which develops cosmetics, health foods and drug discovery. Furthermore, the group operates the business school SBI Graduate School. SBI is listed on the first section of the Tokyo Stock Exchange and Osaka Securities Exchange.

Overview 
Founded in 1999, the company was initially part of the Softbank group. The company was listed on the Osaka Stock exchange in December 2000 and subsequently on the Tokyo Stock Exchange in 2002. The SBI Group became completely independent from Softbank in 2006. The Financial Services Business is based on an Internet-based financial ecosystem, and undertakes a broad range of financial services, including securities, banking and insurance. At the Asset Management Business, the group conducts investments into and incubation of startup companies, and through the biotechnology-related business, it undertakes the R&D and manufacturing of pharmaceuticals, health foods and other products. The company has stated in its 2020 annual report that, "Moving forward, we will pursue business growth by actively promoting the Open Alliance initiative, to develop win-win relationships with companies that have advanced technologies in such areas as fintech, AI, blockchain and quantum computing, along with companies in different industries. Our goal is to sustainably increase the corporate value and social value of the SBI Group through self-evolution and co-creation of value with a wide range of companies".

In 2019, SBI Holdings announced its plans to create a 4th Japanese megabank by consolidating several Japanese regional banks (up to 10) into the group and connecting them to SBI's technological pool.

History 

 1999 
April - As a result of a business reorganization accompanying the conversion of SoftBank Corp. (SoftBank Group Corp. as of Jan 2021) into a pure holding company, Softbank Finance Corporation became an independent company to oversee financial-related business activities.
July - Established as SOFTBANK INVESTMENT CORPORATION; start of venture capital business. 
Oct. - E*TRADE SECURITIES Co., Ltd. (currently SBI SECURITIES Co., Ltd.) commenced Internet trading services. 
Nov - Softbank Ventures Inc. (currently SBI Investment Co., Ltd.) became a wholly owned consolidated subsidiary.
 2000
 December 15 - The company was listed on JASDAQ (merged with Osaka Securities Exchange in 2010)
 2002
 February 15 - Tokyo Stock Exchange listed on the First Section of the market
 November 27- Listed on the First Section of the Osaka Securities Exchange
 2003
 June 2- E-Trade Co., Ltd. merged
 2004
 March 16- Merged with SBI Real Estate Co., Ltd.
 2005
 July 1 - Changed name to SBI Holdings, Inc., and transitioned to a holding company structure.
 2006
 Merged with SBI Partners Co., Ltd. and Finance All Corp.
 August - A wholly owned subsidiary of SoftBank Corp. (name as of Jan 2021 : SoftBank Group Corp.) sold its entire stake in SBI Holdings, Inc.
 2007
August - SBI Japannext Co., Ltd. (currently Japannext Co., Ltd.) began operation of a proprietary trading system (PTS).
September - SBI Sumishin Net Bank, Ltd. commenced operations.
 2008
 January - SBI Insurance Co., Ltd. commenced operations
July - SBI E*TRADE SECURITIES Co., Ltd. changed its name to SBI SECURITIES Co., Ltd
November - SBI Sumishin Net Bank, Ltd. commenced business
 2011
 April 14 - Hong Kong Stock Exchange listed on the ( SEHK :  6488 )
 On April 27, 2011, SBI Securities, a unit of SBI Holdings, agreed to acquire a 25 percent stake in PT BNI Securities, a subsidiary company of Bank Negara Indonesia for Rp.114 billion ($16.70 million).
 May- Opened a representative office in Kuala Lumpur , the capital of Malaysia
 2012
 March - China Dalian, China business management company changed name to "思佰益 Investment Co., Ltd. (English name: SBI (China) Co., Ltd. )"
April -  SBI ALApromo Co., Ltd., commenced business. 
May - SBI FXTRADE Co., Ltd., commenced business.
 2014
 June 25- Delisted from the Hong Kong Stock Exchange.
 2015
October - SBI Thai Online Securities Co., Ltd., a first pure-play online securities company in Thailand, commenced business.
 2016
 November—Established "SBI Virtual Currencies Co., Ltd." (name in 2021: SBI VC Trade Co., Ltd.), which provides virtual currency exchange and trading services.
 2017
 October-Established a joint holding company " JAL SBI FinTech " to provide new services utilizing Japan Airlines and FinTech .
 2018
 September—Subsidiary SBI Insurance Group Co., Ltd. is listed on the Tokyo Stock Exchange Mothers.

2019
April - SBI NEOMOBILE SECURITIES Co., Ltd. established by SBI SECURITIES and CCC Marketing Co., Ltd., commenced business.
May - Established a representative office in Philippines
October - Formed business alliance with Z Holdings Group in the Financial Services Business.
November - Established Strategic Business Innovator Berlin GmbH., a subsidiary in Germany
 2020
 April - Acquired Cambodian microfinance institution SBI LY HOUR BANK PLC. (formerly Ly Hour Microfinance Institution PLC.) and obtained a banking license.
April - Concluded basic agreement with the SMBC Group on a strategic capital and business alliance.
October- Acquired all shares of Livestar Securities , making it a wholly owned subsidiary of the intermediate holding company SBI Financial Services. Acquired all shares of TaoTao Inc., which operates the crypto asset exchange TAOTAO, and made it a wholly owned subsidiary.
December - SBI Digital Asset Holdings Co., Ltd., a subsidiary of SBI Holdings, announces with the SIX group Plans for Singapore-Based Joint Exchange Venture

References

External links 
 Website SBI group (English site)

Companies listed on the Osaka Exchange
Companies listed on the Tokyo Stock Exchange
Companies formerly listed on the Hong Kong Stock Exchange
Financial services companies based in Tokyo
Insurance companies based in Tokyo
Banks of Japan
SoftBank Group
Financial services companies established in 1999
Japanese companies established in 1999
Blockchains